Capricious may refer to:

 Capricieuse, also spelled Capricious, a solitaire card game
 Capricious (cheese), an aged goat's milk cheese

See also
 Arbitrary and capricious, a legal term
 Caprice (disambiguation)